Rodrigo Cortés Giráldez (born 31 May 1973) is a Spanish film director, producer, screenwriter, editor, writer and occasional actor. He is best known for directing the 2010 psychological thriller Buried.

Early life
Rodrigo Cortés was born in Pazos Hermos (Cenlle, province of Ourense) on 31 May 1973, but soon moved to Salamanca, where he spent most of his childhood and his early 20s.

Career
Cortés' fondness for film making started at an early age. At 16 he had already directed his first short film in Super 8. In 1998 he directed the short Yul that won over 20 awards and in 2001 he released 15 Days, a fake documentary in the form of a large short film that earned over 57 awards at festivals, becoming the most awarded Spanish short film of the time.

In 2007 he directed The Contestant (Concursante in Spanish), his first feature film that was released with critical applause and earned several awards, including the Critic's prize at Málaga Film Festival. He directed and edited the 2010 thriller Buried, starring Ryan Reynolds. The film premiered at the Sundance Film Festival, and has received considerable acclaim.

In 2012 Cortés released Red Lights, a film about a physicist and a psychology professor who specialise in debunking supernatural phenomena, it stars Robert De Niro, Sigourney Weaver, Cillian Murphy and Elizabeth Olsen.

He reunited with Buried screenwriter Chris Sparling for his 2018 movie Down a Dark Hall, based on the novel of the same name by Lois Duncan and produced by Twilight writer Stephenie Meyer.

Philosophy
In a 2012 interview, following the release of Red Lights, Cortés explained his perspective on independent filmmaking in an online interview:

... I don’t believe in indie or studio as labels. As an audience member, what I want is to hear strong voices and clear personalities and to feel challenged; not to feel reaffirmed on my own decisions or whatever... it’s never about where you shoot. It’s about what and about how. I mean that. This is not a pro-Hollywood or anti-Hollywood position. I learned to love cinema via the studio movies and of course Scorsese films, Spielberg films, and Hitchcock. All of them did studio pictures with very strong voices. It’s about finding this margin of expressing and exploring the things that touch your sensitive points.

Filmography

Film

Short films

Acting roles

Television

References

External links
 

1973 births
Living people
People from O Ribeiro
Spanish film directors
Film directors from Galicia (Spain)
Spanish film editors
Spanish film producers
Spanish male screenwriters
Horror film directors
21st-century Spanish screenwriters